Jobling is a surname. Notable people with the surname include:

Andrew Jobling (born 1964), Australian rules footballer
Curtis Jobling (born 1972), English illustrator, animator and author
James Wesley Jobling (1876–1961), American physician and professor
Joe Jobling (1906–1969), English footballer
John Jobling (born 1937), Australian politician
Karen Jobling (born 1962), English cricketer
Keith Jobling (1934–2020), English footballer
Kevin Jobling (born 1968), English footballer
Robert Jobling (1841–1923), British artist